Mohammad Kandi may refer to:
 Mohammad Kandi, East Azerbaijan
 Mohammad Kandi, West Azerbaijan